The Professor Josef Ludwig Holub (5 February 1930 in Mladá Boleslav, (now Czech Republic) – 23 July 1999) was a Czech botanist who described a number of new species, worked on systematic reorganization of botanical groups, and contributed greatly to the study of European flora.

Biography 
Josef Holub studied at Charles University in Prague, becoming a lecturer in botany in 1953.

He co-founded the Czech Institute of Botany where he worked for many years. He also helped create the Department of Biosystematics,  and the journal Folia, published by the "Geobotanical and Phytotaxonomic Institute.

In 1991 he was named president of the Czech Botanical Society.

He participated in many botanical field studies in central Europe.

Work 
He worked on vascular plant taxonomy.
He contributed to economic botany, especially with his work on the flora of Slovakia and the Czech Republic. 
Holub, J et al. 1967. "Sobrevista de las unidades de vegetación superior de Checoslovaquia", Rozpr.Čs.Acad. Sci. Praga: 77/3: 1-75

He performed extensive work on the order Lycopodiales and the systematics of the Equisetaceae. He also made substantial contributions to the studies of the fern genera Dryopteris, Lastraea, and Thelypteris.

Other plant genera he worked on included Helictotrichon, Avenula, Rubus and Crataegus.  
He was a principal author of Flora of the Czech Republic and the Flora of Slovakia.

Holub contributed to the lists of threatened species for several regions, contributing the Redbook of Endangered Species.

References 

 1995. Lumbreras, EL. "In memoriam", Professor Josef Holub
 Flora Montiberica: 13: 4-5. ISSN 1138-5952

External links 
 

1930 births
1999 deaths
Pteridologists
Economic botanists
Charles University alumni
Academic staff of Charles University
Czechoslovak botanists